Francesco Gargano (5 May 1899 – 29 October 1975) was an Italian fencer. He won a gold medal in the team sabre event at the 1920 Summer Olympics.

References

1899 births
1975 deaths
Italian male fencers
Olympic fencers of Italy
Fencers at the 1920 Summer Olympics
Olympic gold medalists for Italy
Olympic medalists in fencing
Sportspeople from the Province of Catania
Medalists at the 1920 Summer Olympics